"Devil's Got a New Disguise" is a promotional single by Aerosmith that was the title track of their compilation album Devil's Got a New Disguise. The song was released to rock radio in October 2006 and peaked at #15 on the Mainstream Rock Tracks.

Originally titled "Susie Q", the song was culled from outtakes from the Pump sessions. This particular version originated from the Get a Grip album sessions and re-recorded for 2006.

In concert
Aerosmith played "Devil's Got a New Disguise" live for the first time on October 11, 2006 in Clarkston, Michigan on their Route of All Evil Tour.  The song became a regular in the setlist for the remainder of the tour. Since the Route of All Evil Tour, the song has not been played once in the set.

2006 songs
2006 singles
Aerosmith songs
Columbia Records singles
Songs written by Joe Perry (musician)
Songs written by Steven Tyler
Songs written by Diane Warren